An original equipment manufacturer (OEM) is generally perceived as a company that produces non-aftermarket parts and equipment that may be marketed by another manufacturer.  It is a common industry term recognized and used by many professional organizations such as SAE International, ISO, and others.

However, the term is also used in several other ways, which causes ambiguity. It sometimes means the maker of a system that includes other companies' subsystems, an end-product producer, an automotive part that is manufactured by the same company that produced the original part used in the automobile's assembly, or a value-added reseller.

Automotive parts
When referring to auto parts, OEM refers to the manufacturer of the original equipment, that is, the parts assembled and installed during the construction of a new vehicle.  In contrast, aftermarket parts are those made by companies other than the OEM, which might be installed as replacements after the car comes out of the factory.  For example, if Ford used Autolite spark plugs, Exide batteries, Bosch fuel injectors, and Ford's own engine blocks and heads when building a car, then car restorers and collectors consider those to be the OEM parts.  Other-brand parts would be considered aftermarket, such as Champion spark plugs, DieHard batteries, Kinsler fuel injectors, and BMP engine blocks and heads.  Many auto parts manufacturers sell parts through multiple channels, for example to car makers for installation during new-vehicle construction, to car makers for resale as automaker-branded replacement parts, and through general merchandising supply chains.  Any given brand of part can be OEM on some vehicle models and aftermarket on others.

Computer software
Microsoft is a popular example of a company that issues its Windows operating systems for use by OEM computer manufacturers via the bundling of Microsoft Windows. OEM product keys are priced lower than their retail counterparts, especially as they are purchased in bulk quantities, although they use the same software as retail versions of Windows. They are primarily for PC manufacturer OEMs and system builders, and as such are typically sold in volume licensing deals to a variety of manufacturers (Dell, HP, ASUS, Acer, Lenovo, Wistron, Inventec, Supermicro, Compal Electronics, Quanta Computer, Foxconn, Pegatron, Jabil, Flex, etc.). These OEMs commonly use a procedure known as System Locked Pre-installation, which pre-activates Windows on PCs that are to be sold via mass distribution. These OEMs also commonly bundle software that is not installed on stock Windows on the images of Windows that will be deployed with their PCs (appropriate hardware drivers, anti-malware and maintenance software, various apps, etc.).

Individuals may also purchase OEM "system-builder" licenses for personal use (to include virtual hardware), or for sale/resale on PCs which they build.  Per Microsoft’s EULA regarding PC manufacturers and system-builder OEM licenses, the product key is tied to the PC motherboard which it is initially installed on, and there is typically no transferring the key between PCs afterward.  This is in contrast to retail keys, which may be transferred, provided they are only activated on one PC at a time.  A significant hardware change will trigger a reactivation notice, just as with retail.

Direct OEMs are officially held liable for things such as installation/recovery media, and as such were commonly provided until the late-2000s. These were phased out in favor of recovery partitions located on the primary storage drive of the PC (and available for order from the manufacturer upon request) for the user to repair or restore their systems to the factory state. This not only cut down on costs, but was also a consequence of the gradual obsolescence and phasing out of optical media from 2010 onward. System builders also have a different requirement regarding installation media from Direct OEMs.  

While a clean retail media of Windows can be installed and activated on these devices with OEM keys (most commonly using the SLP key that's embedded in to the system firmware already), actual OEM recovery media that was created by the PC manufacturer (not system-builder, nor retail Windows versions) typically only works on the PC model line that was designed for it. For example, a recovery disc/USB for a Toshiba Satellite P50-B will only work on that model, and not a Satellite S55T.

Economies of scale

OEMs rely on their ability to drive down the cost of production through economies of scale. Using an OEM also allows the purchasing company to obtain needed components or products without owning and operating a factory.

Misuse

Some companies mistakenly use the title OEM when referring to Custom Machine Builders, Systems Integrators, and other companies that design and build custom factory automation.  Two such companies include Keyence and Omron.

See also
 Contract manufacturer
 Electronics manufacturing services
 Open-design movement
 Open-source hardware
 Original design manufacturer
 Outsourcing
 Private label
 Rebranding
 Secondary market
 Value-added reseller

References

Business terms
Manufacturing
Outsourcing